Hendricus Gerardus van de Sande Bakhuyzen (April 2, 1838, The Hague – January 8, 1923, Leiden) was a Dutch astronomer. His surname, van de Sande Bakhuyzen, is sometimes erroneously given as Backhuyzen or Bakhuysen. His first name is sometimes given as Hendrik Gerard.  Not to be confused with his father, the animal painter Hendrik van de Sande Bakhuyzen (1795–1860).

He studied astronomy under Frederik Kaiser.

After he got his degree, he was a high school teacher from 1864–1867, during which time he wrote a very successful textbook on mechanics. In 1867 he became a professor at the Technical College in Delft.

He became director of the Leiden Observatory in 1872 upon the death of Frederik Kaiser. He retired in 1908. Van de Sande Bakhuyzen became member of the Royal Netherlands Academy of Arts and Sciences in 1872.

He chose to concentrate on fundamental astronomy rather than on the then-new field of spectroscopy. He worked mainly on the observation of asteroids, but also proved the connection between a meteor shower on November 27 and the comet 3D/Biela. He also worked on geodesy.

He edited and published the Mars drawings of Johann Hieronymus Schröter in 1881, long after the latter's death.

He married Geertruida van Vollenhoven, who died in 1910. They had two daughters and a son, Adriaan, who would be mayor of Leiden from 1927 to 1941.

His brother Ernest-Frederich van de Sande Bakhuyzen was also an astronomer who worked at the Leiden Observatory.

Bakhuysen crater (with an "s") on Mars is named for him.

References

External links
 Liber Amicorum H.G. van de Sande Bakhuyzen (1908) online
 AN 218 (1923) 47/48 (one line)
 MNRAS 84 (1924) 226
 Obs 46 (1923) 60 (one paragraph)
 PASP 35 (1923) 129 (one paragraph)

1838 births
1923 deaths
19th-century Dutch astronomers
Members of the Royal Netherlands Academy of Arts and Sciences
Scientists from The Hague
20th-century Dutch astronomers